Olle Alsing (born May 1, 1996) is a Swedish professional ice hockey defenceman for Leksands IF of the Swedish Hockey League (SHL). Alsing has previously played for the Ottawa Senators of the National Hockey League and Djurgårdens IF of the Swedish Hockey League.

Playing career
Alsing played as a youth within Almtuna IS before making his Swedish Hockey League (SHL) debut with Leksands IF during the 2016–17 season. Unable to prevent Leksand's relegation to the HockeyAllsvenskan, Alsing later agreed to return to the SHL in the 2018–19 season, after securing a contract with Djurgårdens IF on 2 May 2018. In his first season with Djurgården, Alsing led the SHL in plus/minus rating (+26) while ranking second among club defencemen in scoring with 15 points in 49 regular season games. He added 4 goals and 4 assists over 18 playoff games, helping his team to the SHL Finals, where Djurgården fell to Frölunda HC in 6 games.

On 10 May 2019, having gained NHL interest, the Ottawa Senators signed Alsing to a two-year entry-level contract. He was returned on loan by the Senators to continue his development in the SHL with Djurgårdens IF for the 2019–20 season. In the following 2020–21 season, with the North American season delayed due to the ongoing pandemic, Alsing signed a short-term contract with Austrian club, Graz99ers of the ICE Hockey League. He returned upon commencement of the Senators season, making his eventual NHL debut against the Montreal Canadiens on 5 May 2021, playing alongside fellow rookie Jacob Bernard-Docker. He played in four games for Ottawa and eleven games for Ottawa's American Hockey League affiliate, the Belleville Senators.

As an impending restricted free agent, Alsing opted to leave the Senators by signing a one-year contract with Kazakh based club, Barys Nur-Sultan of the Kontinental Hockey League (KHL), on 28 May 2021. He played in 48 games in the KHL with Barys, scoring 2 goals and 11 points.

Following a lone season in the KHL, Alsing returned to his original Swedish club in the off-season, agreeing to a two-year contract with Leksands IF, on 12 May 2022.

Career statistics

Awards and honours

References

External links
 

1996 births
Living people
Almtuna IS players
Barys Nur-Sultan players
Belleville Senators players
Djurgårdens IF Hockey players
Graz 99ers players
Leksands IF players
Ottawa Senators players
Swedish ice hockey defencemen
Sportspeople from Uppsala
Undrafted National Hockey League players